This is a list of Danish records in swimming, which are ratified by the Danish Swimming Federation. All records were achieved in finals unless otherwise noted.

Long course (50 m)

Men

Women

Mixed relay

Short course (25 m)

Men

Women

Mixed relay

References
General
Danish Records 16 December 2022 updated
Specific

External links
Danish Swimming Federation
Danish Swimming Federation Records subpage

Denmark
Records
Swimming
Swimming